Aarón Díaz Spencer (born March 7, 1982) is an American-Mexican actor, singer, and model.

Early life
Aarón Díaz Spencer was born in Puerto Vallarta, Jalisco, Mexico to an Irish-American mother (surname Spencer) and a Mexican father (surname Díaz).

Career
He made his acting debut in the popular teen drama Clase 406, playing the role of Kike González. In 2004, he followed Clase 406 with another teen drama titled Corazones al límite co-starring with Sherlyn and Sara Maldonado. He later played the role of the older Andrés Romero in the telenovela Barrera de amor starring Yadhira Carrillo. He also starred with Sherlyn in Mexico's stage production of Grease.

Diaz signed on in 2006 with Pedro Damian, (creator of Clase 406) to be Alexander Von Ferdinand, the main male protagonist for the teen telenovela Lola...Érase una vez, co-starring with Eiza González and Grettell Valdez, which premiered on February 26, 2007 on Canal 5.

In 2008 he debuted as a designer and entrepreneur with the clothing brand Perra.

Aside from acting, Díaz is also a singer and he released his first album titled Enamórate de mí in June 2009. His second album self-titled Aaron Diaz, was released in 2011.

From 2010 to 2011 he was the main protagonist alongside Angelique Boyer and Sebastián Rulli in the latest version of the telenovela Teresa, playing the role of Mariano.

In November 2011, Díaz made his debut in American television show in the ABC series Pan Am, playing the role of Miguel.

For the first time in his career, Díaz starred in an antagonist role in the telenovela, El Talismán, where he played the role of Antonio Negrete, alongside Blanca Soto and Rafael Novoa.

In 2016, Díaz was cast in the ABC thriller series Quantico in the recurring role of CIA recruit, León Velez.

Personal life
In 2007, he began dating actress Kate del Castillo, and they were married on August 29, 2009 in Las Vegas, Nevada. A religious ceremony was later held in the Episcopal Church in San Miguel de Allende, Mexico on September 5 of the same year.

Filmography

Films

Television

Theater
Vaselina - Danny.

Discography
Aarón Díaz (2011) 
Enamórate de mí (2009)

Awards and nominations

References

External links

1982 births
Mexican male film actors
Mexican male singers
Mexican male stage actors
Mexican male telenovela actors
Mexican male models
Citizens of the United States through descent
American male film actors
American male stage actors
American male telenovela actors
American male models
People from Puerto Vallarta
Male actors from Jalisco
People from Palo Alto, California
Male actors from Palo Alto, California
Living people
Mexican people of American descent
Mexican people of Irish descent
American musicians of Mexican descent
American people of Irish descent
21st-century Mexican singers
21st-century American singers
21st-century American male singers
American male actors of Mexican descent